Enmore is a village and civil parish  west of Bridgwater on the Quantock Hills in the Sedgemoor district of Somerset, England. The parish includes the hamlet of Bare Ash.

History

The parish name means Duck marsh.

In the Domesday book of 1086, Enmore contained 8 families. From around 1100 the manor was held by the Malet family, with Sir Baldwin Malet obtaining a grant of a Monday market and three-day fair in 1401.

Enmore was part of the hundred of Andersfield.

Barford House sits in a landscaped park. It was built around 1710 for the Jeanes family.

Enmore Castle, built between 1751 and 1756 for John Perceval, 2nd Earl of Egmont, received 'the dismissive mockery of Horace Walpole'. Much of the building, including the offices and stables, were underground and accessed via the dry moat. The Percevals were forced to sell the castle in 1833 to pay off debts. It was bought by Nicholas Broadmead who subsequently demolished a large proportion of the building the following year. The castle once again underwent major change in 1930 when H. H. Broadmead demolished even more of the old building. The remaining portion is now divided into two dwellings.

Governance

The parish council has responsibility for local issues, including setting an annual precept (local rate) to cover the council's operating costs and producing annual accounts for public scrutiny. The parish council evaluates local planning applications and works with the local police, district council officers, and neighbourhood watch groups on matters of crime, security, and traffic. The parish council's role also includes initiating projects for the maintenance and repair of parish facilities, as well as consulting with the district council on the maintenance, repair, and improvement of highways, drainage, footpaths, public transport, and street cleaning. Conservation matters (including trees and listed buildings) and environmental issues are also the responsibility of the council.

The village falls within the Non-metropolitan district of Sedgemoor, which was formed on 1 April 1974 under the Local Government Act 1972, having previously been part of Bridgwater Rural District, which is responsible for local planning and building control, local roads, council housing, environmental health, markets and fairs, refuse collection and recycling, cemeteries and crematoria, leisure services, parks, and tourism.

Somerset County Council is responsible for running the largest and most expensive local services such as education, social services, libraries, main roads, public transport, policing and fire services, trading standards, waste disposal and strategic planning.

It is also part of the Bridgwater and West Somerset county constituency represented in the House of Commons of the Parliament of the United Kingdom. It elects one Member of Parliament (MP) by the first past the post system of election, and was part of the South West England constituency of the European Parliament prior to Britain leaving the European Union in January 2020, which elected seven MEPs using the d'Hondt method of party-list proportional representation.

Education

Enmore County Primary School is believed to have opened in 1810 probably in a cottage very close to the church. It was the first Free National School in England. The present fabric dates from 1848 and was built by a local family, the Loxtons.

Leisure and Recreation

Locating in the village in 1932, Enmore Park Golf Club is one of the largest attractions in the village, and is located towards the centre of the village

Religious sites

The Church of St Michael has 13th-century origins but the present building is largely from the 15th century. It has been designated by English Heritage as a Grade II* listed building.

References

External links

Villages in Sedgemoor
Civil parishes in Somerset